Litvinovka is a rural locality (a settlement) in Novoozyorsky Selsoviet, Talmensky District, Altai Krai, Russia. The population was 213 as of 2013. There are 5 streets.

Geography 
Litvinovka is located 32 km southeast of Talmenka (the district's administrative centre) by road. Ozyorki is the nearest rural locality.

References 

Rural localities in Talmensky District